Bren Foster (born 2 November 1976) is an Australian actor and martial artist. He is best known for his role in The Last Ship on TNT. Foster holds black belts in taekwondo, hapkido, hwarangdo and Brazilian jiu-jitsu.

Career
Foster has appeared in television series such as Days of Our Lives and Melissa & Joey, and films such as Cedar Boys and Force of Execution.  In 2015, Foster landed the recurring role of CPO Wolf "Wolf-Man" Taylor on the TNT post-apocalyptic drama series The Last Ship.

Filmography

Film

Television

Video games

References

External links
 

Living people
Australian hapkido practitioners
Australian male taekwondo practitioners
Australian practitioners of Brazilian jiu-jitsu
American hapkido practitioners
American male taekwondo practitioners
American practitioners of Brazilian jiu-jitsu
Australian male film actors
American male actors
American male film actors
Male actors from London
Australian emigrants to the United States
20th-century Australian male actors
21st-century Australian male actors
20th-century American male actors
21st-century American male actors
Australian expatriate male actors in the United States
Australian expatriates in the United States 
1976 births